Bridger is both a surname and a given name. Notable people with the name include:

Surname:
Bobby Bridger (born 1945), American artist
Deonne Bridger (born 1972), Australian athlete
Harry Bridger (18th century), English professional cricketer
Irene Bridger (21st century), Canadian singer
Lewis Bridger (born 1989), English motorcycle racer
Samuel Bridger (born 1777), English professional cricketer
Tom Bridger (1934-1991), British racing driver
Joseph Bridger, Colonial Governor of Virginia
Jim Bridger, American explorer after whom many places are named
Bridger family of Virginia, notable to American history

Given name:
 Bridger Palmer (born 1998), American actor
 Bridger Nielson (born 1977), American cinematographer and filmmaker

Fictional characters:
Nathan Bridger, a character on the television series seaQuest DS
Ezra Bridger, a character on the television series Star Wars Rebels
"Mr. Bridger", a character in The Italian Job
Billy Bridger, a character in the video game Battlefield V. 
Arthur Bridger, the father of Billy in Battlefield V.